Southern Literary Journal and Monthly Magazine was a journal founded in 1835 by Daniel K. Whitaker and published until 1837 by J.S. Burges from Charleston, South Carolina.

Its primary contributor was William Gilmore Simms, whose most notable article is "American Criticism and Critics."

WorldCat records a The Southern Literary Journal, and Magazine of Arts published between 1837–1838, also from Charleston.

References

Monthly magazines published in the United States
American Southern literary magazines
Defunct literary magazines published in the United States
Magazines established in 1835
Magazines disestablished in 1837
Magazines published in South Carolina
Mass media in Charleston, South Carolina